Marc Rardin is an American baseball coach and former player, who is the current head baseball coach of the Western Kentucky Hilltopppers. He played college baseball at Indian Hills Community College before transferring to Iowa Wesleyan University. He then served as the head coach of the Iowa Western Reivers (2004–2022)

Playing career
Rardin attended Starmont High School in Arlington, Iowa and played college baseball at Indian Hills Community College before transferring to Iowa Wesleyan University.

Coaching career
Rardin began his coaching career as the pitching coach at Bluefield College. In 1998, he became an volunteer pitching coach at Baylor. Following a 2-year stint as an assistant with the Bears, he took the pitching coach position with the Yavapai Roughriders. After a brief stint with Lamar Community College, Rardin was named the head coach at Iowa Western Community College. While at Iowa Western, Rardin would lead the Reivers to 3 National Junior College Athletic Association (NJCAA) national championships.

On June 15, 2022, Rardin was named the head coach of the Western Kentucky Hilltoppers.

Head coaching record

References

External links
 Western Kentucky Hilltoppers bio

Baylor Bears baseball coaches
Bluefield Rams baseball coaches
Indian Hills Warriors baseball players
Iowa Wesleyan Tigers baseball players
Iowa Western Reivers baseball coaches
Lamar Runnin' Lopes baseball coaches
Western Kentucky Hilltoppers baseball coaches
Yavapai Roughriders baseball coaches
Baseball players from Iowa
Living people
Year of birth missing (living people)